Beverage Digest is a privately-owned subscription publication covering the global non-alcoholic beverage industry. The company was founded in 1982 by Jesse Meyers and sells premium market intelligence and data.

Beverage Digest organizes conferences each year, where senior executives in the industry share their view on trends. Beverage manufacturers often quote information from the annual Beverage Digest Fact Book and the twice-monthly Beverage Digest newsletter in their press releases.

Beverage Digest is edited and published by Duane D. Stanford Jr., based in Atlanta, Georgia.

Although the newsletter is written for executives in the non-alcoholic drinks industry, its articles are often cited in publications with a broader audience.
The New York Times has based a number of articles in part on information first published by Beverage Digest. The Los Angeles Times also cites the magazine as an authority in various stories.
Forbes magazine, Yahoo! News and Reuters have also quoted the magazine. 
USA Today often bases stories on information first published in Beverage Digest.

References

External links
 

Business magazines published in the United States
Professional and trade magazines
Magazines established in 1982
Non-alcoholic drinks
Advertising-free magazines
Newsletters
Food and drink magazines
Magazines published in New York (state)
1982 establishments in New York (state)